Alinma Bank is a Saudi joint stock company formed in accordance with Royal Decree No. M/15 dated 28 March 2006 and Ministerial Resolution No. 42 dated 27 March 2007. The bank was established with share capital of SAR 20 billion, consisting of 1.5 billion shares with a nominal value of SAR 10 per share. The company has more than 2,658 employees

Ownership structure
Alinma Bank’s founding shareholders are as follows: The Saudi Arabian Public Investment Fund (PIF), the Saudi Arabian Public Pension Agency (PPA) and the Saudi Arabian General Organization for Social Insurance (GOSI). Together they represent 30% of the bank’s share capital, all with equal shares. The remaining 70% of the bank’s shares were offered for public subscription in April 2008.

Bank activities
Alinma provides a comprehensive range of Shariah-compliant retail and corporate banking and investment services. The bank serves its clients through a nationwide network of branches and ATMs, as well as through its alternative channels, Alinma Internet, Alinma Phone, Alinma Mobile and the Alinma App for smart devices.

Location 
The Alinma head office is located in Al-Anoud Tower on King Fahad Highway in the Saudi capital, Riyadh.

See also 

 List of banks in Saudi Arabia

External links 

.موقع مصرف الإنماء - المملكة العربية السعودية
Alinma Bank website - Saudi Arabia
Alinma Bank's info on Bloomberg.com
Alinma Bank Reaches 1000th ATM Milestone 
Alinma Self Service Banking

2006 establishments in Saudi Arabia
Companies listed on Tadawul
Banks of Saudi Arabia
Islamic banks
Banks established in 2006
Companies based in Riyadh